The 1967–68 FA Cup was the 87th season of the world's oldest football cup competition, the Football Association Challenge Cup, commonly known as the FA Cup. West Bromwich Albion won the competition, beating Everton 1–0 after extra time in the final at Wembley, London.

Matches were played at the stadium of the team named first on the date specified for each round, which was always a Saturday. If the weather was inclement, a match may have been played at a different date to that originally planned. If scores were level after 90 minutes had been played, a replay would take place at the stadium of the second-named team later the same week. If the replayed match was drawn further replays would be held at neutral venues until a winner was determined. If scores were level after 90 minutes had been played in a replay, a 30-minute period of extra time would be played.

Calendar

Results

First Round Proper

At this stage clubs from the Football League Third and Fourth Division joined 30 non-league clubs having come through the qualifying rounds. To complete this round, Enfield and Skelmersdale United were given byes. Matches were due to be played on Saturday, 9 December 1967, but snow and ice forced the postponement of 12 ties and the abandonment of two more, at Tow Law and Brentford.

Second Round Proper 
The matches were scheduled for Saturday, 6 January 1968, though the match at Tow Law was postponed due to bad weather. Four matches were drawn, with replays taking place as soon as conditions permitted.

Third Round Proper
The 44 First and Second Division clubs entered the competition at this stage. The matches were played on Saturday, 27 January 1968. Ten matches were drawn, with replays taking place later the same week, and one tie required a second replay.

Fourth Round Proper
The matches were played on Saturday, 17 February 1968. Six matches were drawn and replayed later the same week.

Fifth Round Proper
The matches were played on Saturday, 9 March 1968. Four matches were drawn and replayed later the same week.

Sixth Round Proper

Replay

Second replay

Semi-finals

Final

The final took place on Saturday, 18 May 1968 at Wembley and ended in a victory for West Bromwich Albion over Everton by 1–0 after extra time. The goal was scored by Jeff Astle, who scored in every round in which his team had played. The attendance was 100,000.

Notes
A. : Match played at Griffin Park, London.
B. : Match played at Ashton Gate, Bristol.
C. : Match played at Bootham Crescent, York.

References
General
The FA Cup Archive at TheFA.com
English FA Cup 1967/68  at Soccerbase

Specific

 
FA Cup seasons
Fa
Eng